Alfredo Bastianelli (born Rome, Italy, 26 January 1951) is an Italian diplomat, Chancellor of the Order of the Holy Sepulchre, and Papal Gentleman. He is married and has three children.

Education 
Bastianelli holds a law degree from Sapienza University of Rome. Besides his native Italian, Bastianelli speaks English, French and Portuguese.

Career 
He held various posts in the Italian Ministry of Foreign Affairs and diplomatic missions of Italy in Brazil, Canada, Mozambique, Indonesia, European Union.

From 2001 to 2005 he served as an Ambassador to Angola. From 2009 to 2012 he was an ambassador to Cyprus.

From 2013 to 2015 he was an ambassador to Belgium. At the same time, in 2014, for a few months he was in charge of the Istituto Italiano di Cultura in Bruxelles, pending the appointment of a new director.

In 2016 he was appointed Chancellor of the Order of the Holy Sepulchre by Grand Master Cardinal O'Brien.

Titles and Honors

Honors
 Papal Gentleman, Holy See (since 2007)
 Knight Grand Cross of Equestrian Order of the Holy Sepulchre of Jerusalem, Holy See;
 Knight Grand Cross of the Order of St. Gregory the Great, Holy See;
 Knight Grand Cross of the Ordre de la Couronne, Kingdom of Belgium;
 Knight Grand Cross of the Order of Independence, Jordan;
 Knight Grand Cross of the Sacred Military Constantinian Order of Saint George;
 Knight Grand Cross of the Order pro merito melitensi, Sovereign Military Order of Malta.
 Grand Officer of the Order of Merit of the Italian Republic.
Chevalier d’Honneur of Confrérie de la Chaîne des Rôtisseurs.

See also 
 Ministry of Foreign Affairs (Italy)
 Foreign relations of Italy

References

External links

Living people
1951 births
Grand Officers of the Order of Merit of the Italian Republic
Ambassadors of Italy to Angola
Ambassadors of Italy to Cyprus
Ambassadors of Italy to Belgium
Italian diplomats
20th-century diplomats
Knights Grand Cross of the Order of St Gregory the Great
Recipients of the Order pro Merito Melitensi
Papal gentlemen